Courtney Crumrin  is an independent comic book series written and illustrated by Ted Naifeh and released through Oni Press.

Publication history
Courtney Crumrin was originally published as a limited series of 12 comics compiled into three books entitled Courtney Crumrin and the Night Things, Courtney Crumrin and the Coven of Mystics, and Courtney Crumrin in the Twilight Kingdom. Two shorter books entitled Courtney Crumrin and the Fire-Thief's Tale and Courtney Crumrin & the Prince of Nowhere followed, then compiled into a fourth volume Courtney Crumrin's Monstrous Holiday. They pick up from the end of book 12 where Courtney is invited to join her uncle on a trip to Prague.

During the summer of 2005, Naifeh released a one-shot entitled Courtney Crumrin Tales, which focused on Courtney's Uncle Aloysius as a young man. A short color prelude has also appeared in Oni Press Color Special 2002.

In April 2012 Oni Press and Ted Naifeh started a new ongoing series, simply titled Courtney Crumrin, for the first time created in color. This series ran for ten issues and was collected in two volumes, Courtney Crumrin: The Witch Next Door and Courtney Crumrin: The Final Spell.

Naifeh was quoted in 2013 as saying "[I]f I feel drawn back to Courtney's world, I may take another trip there someday. It's not a completely closed door."

Characters
Courtney Crumrin - A young girl who is an outcast at school and ignored by her parents.  When her parents move in with her Uncle Aloysius she discovers she can do magic.
 Aloysius Crumrin - An old man who has shunned public life, but the Coven often asks him to do their dirty work.  A powerful warlock who loves Courtney deeply.
Courtney's parents - Two people who seem to not care that they have a child and are often off in a world of their own. Considered banal by the upper class of Hillsborough. 
Ms. Calpurnia Crisp - Courtney's school teacher.  She is in fact a witch herself, doing a favor for Aloysius, watching over Courtney.
Butterworm - A goblin that lives in the forest by Courtney's home.  He often helps Courtney out but he still seems to be up to no good.
Butterbug - Butterworm's little brother. Can't speak properly because his tongue is too big.
Boo & Quick - Two cats of the neighborhood who can talk and brought Courtney along to witness the selection of a new leader among the cats. 
Tobermory - A huge, scarred cat; former leader of the cats of Hillsborough. Was wounded and lost his left eye fighting a huge Mastiff, The Hound of Radley Hall.
The Dreadful Dutchess - A night thing from the Twilight Kingdom who has begrudgingly helped out Courtney on several occasions because of Courtney's relationship with Skarrow. Her familiars are giant cats.
Skarrow - The Dutchess's "son", in actuality a human, and Courtney's beloved friend in her new town. He lived for centuries in the underworld, then left it, searching for human affection.
The Twilight King - Ruler of the Twilight Kingdom. He was the spirit of the forest on the surface, but Human activity drove him and his subjects underground. His queen stayed "in the dwindling wilds of the earth until they were no more". He rides a horse and wears a crown of barren branches.
Tommy Rawhead & Bloody Bones - "The Worst Goblin That Ever Was", a giant hobgoblin that is feared by other night things and wizards alike. Magic has no effect on him as he has been "accurs'd one hundredfold".

Trade Paperback Volumes 
Volume 1: Courtney Crumrin and the Night Things - 
Volume 2: Courtney Crumrin and the Coven of Mystics - 
Volume 3: Courtney Crumrin in the Twilight Kingdom - 
Volume 4: Courtney Crumrin's Monstrous Holiday ( This is a collected edition of:
Courtney Crumrin and the Fire-Thief's Tale - 
Courtney Crumrin & the Prince of Nowhere - )
Volume 5: The Witch Next Door -  
Volume 6: The Final Spell -  
Volume 7: Tales of a Warlock - 
Courtney Crumrin Tales: A Portrait of the Warlock as a Young Man - 
Courtney Crumrin Tales Volume 2: The League of Ordinary Gentlemen -

References

External links 
 Oni Press
   Ted Naifeh

Horror comics